Edgar Richardson Iro (born 18 November 2000) is a Solomon Islander swimmer. He competed in the men's 100 metre freestyle at the 2020 Summer Olympics.

References

External links
 

2000 births
Living people
Swimmers at the 2020 Summer Olympics
Solomon Islands male swimmers
Olympic swimmers of the Solomon Islands
Swimmers at the 2022 Commonwealth Games
Commonwealth Games competitors for the Solomon Islands